The Rothmans Medal was the premier individual award in the New South Wales Rugby League and Brisbane Rugby League competitions, and later in the Australian Rugby League, which was given to the player voted by referees as the best and fairest in those competitions for the season, first awarded in 1968. With the establishment of the National Rugby League in 1998, the Rothmans Medal was replaced by the Dally M Medal as the official Player of the Year award.

History
The Rothmans Medal was the first official player-of-the-year award to be established in rugby league in Australia. The medal was sponsored by Rothmans International, a tobacco production company. There were two Rothmans Medals awarded each year: one for the best player in the New South Wales Rugby League, and one for the best player in the Brisbane Rugby League.

The voting for the Rothmans Medal was done by the match-day referee. After each match, he awarded three votes to the best player, two votes to the second-best player, and one vote to the third-best player. This is the same basic format as the modern day Dally M, except that the votes are now determined by the media.

The two Rothmans Medals were first awarded in 1968, and were awarded each year until 1996. In 1997, the Rothmans Medal in New South Wales became known as the Provan-Summons medal, because all tobacco advertising and sponsorship was prohibited in Australia in 1992, under the Tobacco Advertising Prohibition Act 1992; the medal then disappeared altogether in 1998 with the merger of the Australian Rugby League and the Australian Super League. The Queensland Rothmans Medal was also last awarded in 1996, as the Queensland Cup superseded the Brisbane Rugby League as Queensland's premier rugby league competition in 1997.

Rothmans Medal winners

New South Wales

Note: includes Provan-Summons Medal winner in 1997.

Queensland

References

External links
Rothmans Medal at qrl.com.au

Rugby league trophies and awards
Awards established in 1968
Australian sports trophies and awards
1968 establishments in Australia